Hunjiang District is a district of the city of Baishan, Jilin, People's Republic of China. It was known as Bādàojiāng District until 22 February 2010, when the State Council of the People's Republic of China approved the name change.

Administrative Divisions
There are eight subdistricts and four towns.

Subdistricts:
Xinjian Subdistrict, Tonggou Subdistrict, Dongxing Subdistrict, Hongqi Subdistrict, Banshi Subdistrict, Hekou Subdistrict, Chengnan Subdistrict, Jiangbei Subdistrict

Towns:
Qidaojiang, Liudaojiang, Hongtuya, Sandaogou

References

External links

Baishan
County-level divisions of Jilin